The Victorian Railways S class was a class of 4-6-2 express passenger steam locomotive operated by the Victorian Railways (VR) in Australia between 1928 and 1954. Built when the VR was at its zenith and assigned to haul the broad gauge-leg of its Melbourne to Sydney interstate express passenger services, the S class remained the VR's most prestigious locomotive class until the advent of diesel electric locomotives in the early 1950s.

They were the first Pacific-type locomotives on the VR, as well as its first 3-cylinder locomotive type. Renowned for their power and speed, in the ten years that followed their introduction the running time of the premier Sydney express service they operated was progressively reduced by one and a half hours. These service improvements culminated in 1937 with the replacement of the Sydney Limited with the Art Deco streamliner Spirit of Progress, and the S class locomotives were fitted with streamlined casings to match the new train set. They were also equipped with long-range tenders to enable the entire  journey to be run non-stop at a speed that remained for the next 20 years Australia's fastest train service.

Although only four S class locomotives were built, they were highly utilised. However their size and heavy axle load made them unsuitable for regular service on any other lines than the North Eastern line, and so within six months of the introduction of the new B class diesel locomotives on the Spirit of Progress roster in April 1954 the S class had all been withdrawn and scrapped. Their scrapping was a catalyst for the rail preservation movement in Victoria to lobby for the preservation of remaining examples of other VR steam locomotives, resulting in the establishment in 1962 of the Australian Railway Historical Society Museum in Williamstown North.

History
The S class locomotives were built to speed up principal expresses and eliminate double-heading of these services by their A2 class 4-6-0 predecessors.

They were the final design of the Victorian Railways' Chief Mechanical Engineer Alfred E Smith, who had been responsible for the highly successful K class 2-8-0 and N class 2-8-2 designs and closely involved with the earlier A2 class 4-6-0, C class 2-8-0, and Dd class 4-6-0 designs.

The S class was VR's first three-cylinder locomotive, and Smith's design was influenced by Nigel Gresley's Great Northern Railway A1 class 4-6-2 with its Gresley conjugated valve gear. The S class also showed American design influence in its use of a delta trailing truck and bar frames rather than plate frames.

Built at Victorian Railways' Newport Workshops, the S class locomotives were, at the time of construction of the first three, the largest locomotives to have been built in Australia, and had the largest boilers to have yet been constructed in the southern hemisphere. Another notable design innovation, the incorporation of all three cylinders and the smokebox saddle into a single  casting, was the first of its type in the southern hemisphere and one of the largest single castings yet undertaken in Australia. This was only possible because a 'set' was placed in the axle of the leading driving wheels, thus allowing all three cylinders to be in the same horizontal plane; this had the added advantage of avoiding many of the middle cylinder problems that beset Gresley's Pacifics.

The S class spent its entire revenue service life on the main North East line, its axle load too high for regular service on any other VR lines. Although Annual Reports show the VR planned to upgrade the main Western line and build further S class locomotives to haul The Overland services between Ararat and Serviceton, exigencies imposed by the Great Depression and World War II meant the planned upgrade of this service never eventuated.

Although a numerically small class limited to a single line, the S class was highly utilised. By November 1929, the three locomotives then in service were reported as doing work would have taxed the capacity of five A2 class locomotives, yet their £53,000 ($106,000) capital cost was £2,000 ($4,000) cheaper than the five A2s and they were further saving an estimated £3,000 ($6,000) per year in comparative operating costs. They were also noted for running  between major overhauls, compared to an average  for other locomotive classes in the Victorian Railways fleet.

Regular service: 1928–1937

On 19 March 1928, S300 hauled its first revenue passenger service between Seymour and Melbourne.

The new locomotive attracted considerable public interest, with details of its construction and trial running reported in the press. On 29 April 1928, S300 went on public display at Flinders Street station in conjunction with fundraising efforts for the building of the Shrine of Remembrance. It was inspected by around 3,000 people.

With the delivery of a further two locomotives (S301 and S302) in February and April 1929 and the strengthening of the Murray River bridge at Albury to carry them, the S class displaced the older A2 class 4-6-0 locomotives from these services. Their superior power had a profound impact on the timetable, which in July of that year saw a cut of half an hour from the previous five hour, nineteen-minute northbound Sydney Limited schedule set for the A2. A fourth locomotive, S303, was delivered in November 1930. Its introduction enabled both  ordinary and 'limited' express services on the Albury line to be rostered for the S class, even if one of the class was in the workshops for repairs.

However by 1931, a severe reduction in passenger traffic caused by the Great Depression saw the S class locomotives withdrawn from running the Sydney express services, and they were put to use on goods trains on the North Eastern line until passenger traffic picked up. As well as allowing Victorian Railways to deflect criticism of its investment in building the S class locomotives, this move also enabled the new X class goods locomotives to be reassigned from the Albury line to mainlines in other areas of the state, where they were reportedly used to considerable benefit.

By 1934, the S class locomotives were back in passenger service and in an effort to improve their appearance, the VR broke with its all-black locomotive livery policy and between May and October outshopped the class in a glossy, wagon red livery.

By July 1935, the S class locomotives had once again accelerated services. The  non-stop run between Seymour and Albury was also Australia's longest.

Design improvements

Initial tests with prototype S300 revealed only average performance for a locomotive of such size. Further detailed study revealed that insufficient valve travel and narrow port openings were impairing performance and, based on that study, improvements were made to the three S class locomotives that followed, including a reported change from the  travel,  lap valve gear, shared with the N and X class locomotives, to a  travel,  lap valve gear.

When first constructed, the trailing delta truck axle under S300 had insufficient lateral damping and, when running at high speed around curves, tended to knock the track out of the ideal transition spiral alignment.

In April 1935, S303 was equipped with VR's Modified Front End for improved drafting and reduced cylinder back pressure. Tests showed a resultant increase in indicated horsepower from 1,560 hp (1,160 kW) to 1,920 hp (1,430 kW) at 30 mph (48 km/h). Smoke deflectors were fitted the following month to compensate for the reduced uplift of smoke from the redesigned exhaust and, between July 1935 and July 1936, the remainder of the class was similarly upgraded.

The boilers were modified to a design that incorporated a combustion chamber, arch tubes and thermic siphons. However, unlike its close relative the X class Mikado, the S class was not modified with Belpaire fireboxes, and retained its round-top boiler shape.

During dynamometer car testing with S301 in 1937, a maximum output of 2,300 drawbar horsepower (1,720 kW) at 45 mph (72 km/h) was recorded.

In common with the LNER Gresley Pacifics from which the design of the S class valve gear was derived, the centre cylinder and the big end bearing of the centre connecting rod were located beneath the steam chest and boiler, where they were exposed to great heat. That caused a problem, which was exacerbated by the reduced ventilation following the fitting of the streamlining associated with the Spirit of Progress service from 1937 onwards, coupled with the faster running speeds involved. The grease-lubricated locomotive axles also suffered overheating problems from the sustained higher-speed running. The VR dealt with both problems by switching to a "red oil" lubricant with a higher resistance to heat.

A final modification late in the life of the S class was the conversion to oil firing from February 1951 onwards, because the scarcity of Maitland coal, and the unsatisfactory performance when running coal from other fields, began to adversely affect locomotive performance and running schedules.

Spirit of Progress: 1937–1954

From November 1937, the S class was assigned to haul the VR's luxurious all-steel, fully air-conditioned streamliner, the Spirit of Progress. At the time, they were the only passenger locomotives on the VR with enough power to take the Spirit'''s eleven-car trailing load of  unassisted over the 1 in 50 gradients between Melbourne and Albury.

S302 was similarly modified during August 1937. While initially painted wagon red, both streamlined locomotives were by November repainted in the royal blue and gold livery designed to seamlessly match the new Spirit of Progress carriages.

With their refurbishment for the Spirit of Progress, the locomotives were also named after prominent figures in early Victorian history:
While in the context of the British locomotive Mallard reaching a recorded  the following year the Spirit's speed was unremarkable, the publicity surrounding the launch of the new streamliner (including footage of the train racing against aircraft) nevertheless captured the public imagination and was widely reported in contemporary press and newsreels.

Locomotives S300 and S303 continued, in their unstreamlined form, to haul Melbourne to Albury services until being converted during major overhauls in March and October 1938 respectively. During this period, they operated the Spirit of Progress when streamlined S class locomotives were unavailable, with a stop at Seymour to take on water.

A minor change to the appearance of the streamlining was the removal of the locomotives' solid cowcatcher and its replacement with a lattice type, after it was discovered that the original design created a partial vacuum behind the cowcatcher, sucking dust and grime into the slide bars for the centre cylinder, leading to maintenance problems.

Accidents
On 25 September 1933, S301 broke a driving axle while hauling the 16:00 express to Albury, causing the left centre driving wheel to separate from the locomotive. There were no casualties, although the locomotive suffered significant damage. An investigation into the accident found that the axles were overstressed and the VR Commissioners announced that all four S class locomotives would be equipped with axles of a revised design.

On 1 September 1935, two S class locomotives each hauling empty passenger trains were involved in a fatal collision when one train collided at speed into the rear of the other, the locomotive of the following train destroying the guards van and fatally injuring the guard in the impact. Damage was estimated at nearly £10,000.

The side valances of the locomotives in streamlined form were prone to damage in the event of collision with trackside objects. During 1950, the valances were shortened to end at the buffer beam rather than extending to the base of the cowcatcher.Dunn et al., Super Power on the VR – Part 2, p. 8

On 15 August 1952, S301 was involved in a fatal level crossing accident when it collided at high speed with a circus truck and trailer at Euroa, killing three people travelling in the truck. The accident caused significant damage to the streamlined cowling of the front of the locomotive. S 301 was temporarily repaired with a semi-streamlined appearance, featuring a standard VR pressed steel slotted cowcatcher and an unstreamlined smokebox.

Demise

The S class was the first casualty of the Victorian Railways dieselisation program, which began in earnest with the delivery of B class mainline diesel electric locomotives in 1952. With their very limited route availability due to their high axle load, and the maintenance costs associated with their age and relatively high mileage, the decision was taken by the Victorian Railways Commissioners to withdraw from service and scrap the S class locomotives as mechanical condition dictated. First to go was S301 in September 1953 with worn cylinders, being recorded as scrapped on 16 October 1953. Usable parts were stored for use in maintaining the three remaining S class locomotives while they remained in service, however the end was drawing near. Following successful trials, B class locomotives replaced the S class locomotives on the Spirit of Progress from April 1954 onwards. The superseded locomotives were rapidly withdrawn and scrapped, with S302 being recorded as scrapped on 2 July 1954 and S303 being recorded as scrapped on 28 May 1954. In June 1954 the last remaining example, class leader S300 was withdrawn, being recorded as scrapped three months later on 17  September 1954.

Preservation

Despite their key place in Australian transport history, and at least one attempt to set aside an example for future preservation, the S class locomotives were scrapped before the rail preservation movement had gained enough momentum to avoid the loss of the entire class. However, the Australian Railway Historical Society has noted that the loss of the S class helped to galvanise railway enthusiasts into lobbying for the preservation of other VR locomotives (beginning with the X class), and the establishment of the Australian Railway Historical Society Museum.

The enormous tender tanks of the S class found a new use as tankers for weed-spraying of VR tracks, and the tender frames and bogies were also converted into QH heavy duty flat wagons. One of the 2,000 gallon oil tanks retrieved from an S class tender was used in April 1954 to convert an R748, to oil firing.

Two of the four tender frames have been earmarked for preservation by the Newport Railway Museum, and are currently used as workshop vehicles at the Newport Workshops numbered VFGA3 & VFGA4. One tender frame and tank are stored by Steamrail Victoria. The fourth tender frame is in the possession of the Seymour Railway Heritage Centre, which now has had a tender body placed on it.

The names and numbers of the four S class steam locomotives were carried over in the same order to the S class diesels introduced in 1957.

At least one of the S class locomotives' whistles survived, and when the Australian Railway Historical Society operated a 50th Anniversary run of the Spirit of Progress on 14 November 1987, it was fitted to R class locomotive R707 to help recreate the sound of the original S class-hauled service.

These and other remnants, such as the Spirit of Progress'' locomotive name and number plates, are all that remains of the S class steam locomotives today.

Model Railways

OO Scale
In 1976, Hornby Railways investigated the prospects of releasing a ready-to-run S Class locomotive, and one unit was produced as a trial.

HO Scale
Broad Gauge Models released the S Class locomotive in brass in the early 1980s. 50 of each streamlined engine in blue were released, along with 30 unstreamlined black models. Light globes were used for headlights and, on the streamlined version, the running gear light; this latter feature has not been replicated since. Unfortunately due to an error in design, the models did not feature ashpans.

Steam Era Models has produced brass kits for the S Class locomotives, designed for the period 1945–1954. The kit includes part for both the coal- and oil-burning variants, and could be backdated to earlier eras with relative ease.

Trainbuilder and other manufactures have released brass ready-to-run models of the class, some streamlined and some not.

The first run of Trainbuilder locomotives included the four blue engines in both coal- and oil-burner variants, released in 2010. The second run, announced in 2017, included S300 & 301 in original black; S300 and S302 painted in red with smoke deflectors; S303 in red, with smoke deflectors and the streamlined tender; S301 streamlined in red with silver, and again all four blue engines in both coal and oil-burner variants.

References

Further reading

External links
 victorianrailways.net S class locomotive page Details and further photographs of S class locomotives
 victorianrailways.net S class locomotive diagram
 Museum of Victoria – S Class 'Pacific' Locos further photographs of S class locomotives

Railway locomotives introduced in 1928
Streamlined steam locomotives
S class
4-6-2 locomotives
Broad gauge locomotives in Australia
Scrapped locomotives